Bogomila Falls is located north of the village of Bogomila in the Municipality of Čaška in North Macedonia.  Bogomila Falls is formed by the Babuna River where it springs below the eastern face of Solunska Glava.

External links
Picture of Bogomila Falls

Waterfalls of North Macedonia
Čaška Municipality